246P/NEAT is a periodic comet discovered on 2004 March 28 by Near-Earth Asteroid Tracking (NEAT) using the  reflector at Haleakala. It was given the permanent number 246P on 2011 January 14.

It is a Quasi-Hilda comet. Due to perturbations by Jupiter, the 2005, 2013 and 2021 perihelion passages will be closer to the Sun. The comet is observable all through its orbit.

References

External links 
 Orbital simulation from JPL (Java) / Horizons Ephemeris
 246P/NEAT – Seiichi Yoshida @ aerith.net
 Elements and Ephemeris for 246P/NEAT – Minor Planet Center
 246P/NEAT at the Minor Planet Center's Database
 246P/NEAT – Kazuo Kinoshita (2011 Dec. 22)

Periodic comets
0246

20040328